The Asheville metropolitan area is a metropolitan area centered on the principal city of Asheville, North Carolina. The U.S. Office of Management and Budget defines the Asheville, North Carolina Metropolitan Statistical Area, a metropolitan statistical area used by the United States Census Bureau and other entities, as comprising the four counties of Buncombe, Haywood, Henderson, and Madison. The area's population was 424,858 according to the 2010 United States Census, and 469,454 according to the 2020 United States Census.

Counties
Buncombe
Haywood
Henderson
Madison
Transylvania

Communities

Places with more than 50,000 inhabitants
Asheville (Principal city)

Places with 5,000 to 15,000 inhabitants
Black Mountain
Brevard
East Flat Rock
Etowah
Fletcher
Hendersonville
Mills River
Swannanoa
Waynesville
Woodfin

Places with 2,500 to 5,000 inhabitants
Canton
Flat Rock
Lake Junaluska
Weaverville

Places with 1,000 to 2,500 inhabitants
Avery Creek
Balfour
Barker Heights
Bent Creek
Biltmore Forest
Clyde
Fairview
Laurel Park
Maggie Valley
Mars Hill
Mountain Home
Valley Hill
West Canton

Places with less than 1,000 inhabitants
Hot Springs
Marshall
Montreat
Rosman
Saluda (partial)

Unincorporated places
Arden
Barnardsville
Bat Cave
Breakaway
Candler
Chesnut Hill
Gerton
Joe
Jupiter
Leicester
Luck
Oteen
Petersburg
Pisgah Forest
Ridgecrest
Skyland
Trust
Walnut

Demographics
As of the census of 2000, there were 369,171 people, 154,290 households, and 103,653 families residing within the MSA. The racial makeup of the MSA was 91.49% White, 5.15% African American, 0.37% Native American, 0.56% Asian, 0.03% Pacific Islander, 1.33% from other races, and 1.06% from two or more races. Hispanic or Latino of any race were 3.15% of the population.

The median income for a household in the MSA was $34,921, and the median income for a family was $41,952. Males had a median income of $30,308 versus $23,069 for females. The per capita income for the MSA was $19,031.

Combined Statistical Area
The Asheville-Brevard Combined Statistical Area is made up of five counties in western North Carolina. The statistical area includes the Asheville Metropolitan Statistical Area and the Brevard Micropolitan Statistical Area.

See also
North Carolina census statistical areas
List of cities, towns, and villages in North Carolina
List of unincorporated communities in North Carolina

References

 
Geography of Buncombe County, North Carolina
Geography of Haywood County, North Carolina
Geography of Henderson County, North Carolina
Geography of Madison County, North Carolina
Metropolitan areas of North Carolina
Western North Carolina